Seirō Jūnitoki Tsuzuki ("Twelve Hours in Yoshiwara") is a series of twelve ukiyo-e prints designed by the Japanese artist Utamaro and published in .  They depict scenes of courtesans in the Yoshiwara pleasure district at each hour of the twelve-hour traditional Japanese time system.

Description and analysis

Seirō ("green house[s]") refers to the yūkaku licensed pleasure quarters—specifically Yoshiwara.  The term seirō originated in Chinese to denote a pavilion in which a nobleman kept a mistress; in Utamaro's time it referred to Yoshiwara's most privileged pleasure houses.

The series depicts a day in Yoshiwara, beginning with a morning-after sequence at the sunrise Hour of the Hare on the twelve-hour traditional Japanese time system, on which each toki unit lasted two modern hours.  The titles appear in a caption shaped as a Japanese clock in a corner of each print.  Though many of the prints show courtesans in the midst of entertainment, the male visitors do not appear, leaving it to purchasers of the prints to imagine themselves in the role of customer.  The scenes are framed as if in candid moments, but are designed for the benefit of the male gaze, as no matter the place, hour, or state of exhaustion, the women maintain their beauty.

U no koku

U no koku is the Hour of the Rabbit, about 6:00 in the morning.

Tatsu no koku

Tatsu no koku is the Hour of the Dragon, about 8:00 in the morning.  Two courtesans are taking to their beds at this early hour, their exhaustion signified by their disheveled clothes and hair.  It is unlikely their customers would see them in such a state and at such an hour.

Mi no koku

Mi no koku is the Hour of the Snake, about 10:00 in the morning.

Uma no koku

Uma no koku is the Hour of the Horse, about 12:00 midday.

Hitsuji no koku

Hitsuji no koku is the Hour of the Goat, about 2:00 in the afternoon.  This would likely be just before the hiru-mise afternoon display of prostitutes.

Saru no koku

Saru no koku is the Hour of the Monkey, about 4:00 in the afternoon.

Tori no koku

Tori no koku is the Hour of the Rooster, about 6:00 in the evening.

Inu no koku

Inu no koku is the Hour of the Dog, about 8:00 in the evening.

A courtesan sits on a scarlet felt rug, perhaps in a harimise, where prostitutes sat on display. She writes a letter on a long scroll; courtesans were expected to write to patrons. Before the courtesan sits a luxurious tobacco tray decorated with makie.

I no koku

I no koku is the Hour of the Pig, about 10:00 in the evening. At such a time, the courtesans are still entertaining their guests; the woman at the left sits erect, carrying a guest's saucer. The diagonals of the kamuros posture and the courtesan's outstretched arm contribute to the balance in the composition.

Ne no koku

Ne no koku is the Hour of the Rat, about midnight.  The two women in the print are preparing for bed after finishing with the night's festivities.  The courtesan at the right has changed into simple nightclothes and is tightening her obi sash with both hands.  In a half-rising posture she peers down at the woman to the left, who appears to be a young courtesan-in-training, is folding up the first woman's uchikake kimono with her chin and both hands.

Ushi no koku

Ushi no koku is the Hour of the Ox, about 2:00 in the morning.  It is deep in the night—the woman in the print has finished her work and is in her nightclothes; the nape of her neck and her left leg protrude from her robe.  She appears exhausted, and her hair hangs disheveled as her head droops.  She holds some twisted paper string in her right hand, lit to light her way, and some kaishi paper in her left hand, as if on her way to the toilet.  She is putting on some zōri sandals, the customary footwear for courtesans in the corridors of the pleasure houses of Yoshiwara.  Her mamoribukuro charm pouch hangs from a byōbu folding screen at the viewer's right.  Art historian Julie Nelson Davis notes that the print may be designed as a "sympathetic portrayal of an exhausted woman", though she "is rendered as an elegant form in a scene designed for the male gaze".

Tora no koku

Tora no koku is the Hour of the Tiger, about 4:00 in the morning.  It was at such an after-work hour that courtesans could talk freely, often to badmouth the guests.  Two courtesans sit and chat before a hibachi heater.  They appear cold, with their arms withdrawn into their kimonos.  The woman to the right fans the hibachi with a folded stack of kaishi paper.

Legacy

The series is rare and highly prized amongst collectors.  The French art critic Edmond de Goncourt considered Seirō Jūnitoki Utamaro's "most visually appealing" series.

Seirō Jūnitoki inspired the French painter Henri de Toulouse-Lautrec's lithographic portfolio Elles.

Notes

References

Works cited

 
 
 
 
 
 
 
 
 

1794 prints
Ukiyo-e print series
Works by Kitagawa Utamaro